"Kick Back Relax" is a pop song recorded by Swedish singer and Idol winner Agnes taken from her second album Stronger. The track was written by Jörgen Elofsson who also wrote her debut single "Right Here Right Now". It was released as the album's first single in September 2006.

The song first entered the Swedish chart on 28 September and peaked that same week at two. It stayed on the chart for fourteen weeks.

Music video
A music video was produced to promote the single.

Track listing
Digital Download
(Released: 7 September 2006)
"Kick Back Relax" [Radio Edit] — 2:59

CD-single (EAN 0886970182324)
(Released: 20 September 2006)
"Kick Back Relax" [Radio Edit] — 2:59
"Kick Back Relax" [Instrumental] — 2:59

Chart performance

Weekly charts

Year-end charts

References

External links
Official Website
Official U.S. Website

2006 songs
Agnes (singer) songs
Songs written by Jörgen Elofsson